The Embassy of Zambia in Washington, D.C. is the diplomatic mission of the Zambia to the United States. It is located at 2419 Massachusetts Avenue, Northwest, Washington, D.C., in the Embassy Row neighborhood.

The Ambassador is Sheila Siwela.

References

External links

Official website
wikimapia

Zambia
Washington, D.C.
United States–Zambia relations
Zambia